Polyozellin is a chemical which occurs in the mushroom Polyozellus multiplex. It inhibits prolyl endopeptidase, an enzyme that has a role in processing proteins (specifically, amyloid precursor protein) in Alzheimer's disease. Chemicals that inhibit prolyl endopeptidase have attracted research interest due to their potential therapeutic effects. Structurally related dibenzofuranyl derivatives of polyozellin are known as kynapcins.

References 

Dibenzofurans
Benzofuran ethers at the benzene ring
Acetate esters
Phenol esters
Hydroxyquinol ethers